N'Diklam Sare (ruled c.1390–c.1420) was the third ruler, or Burba, of the Jolof Empire.

References

14th-century monarchs in Africa
15th-century monarchs in Africa
Year of birth missing
1420 deaths